The 2019–20 Sacramento State Hornets men's basketball team represents California State University, Sacramento in the 2019–20 NCAA Division I men's basketball season. The Hornets are led by 12th-year head coach Brian Katz and play their home games at the Hornets Nest. They are a member of the Big Sky Conference. They finished the season

Previous season

The Hornets finished the 2018–19 season 15–16, 8–12 in Big Sky play to finish in a tie for eighth place. They defeated Northern Arizona in the first round of the Big Sky tournament before losing in the quarterfinals to Montana.

Roster

Schedule

|-
!colspan=12 style=""| Non-conference regular season

|-
!colspan=9 style=""| Big Sky regular season

|-
!colspan=9 style=""| Big Sky tournament

References

Sacramento State
Sacramento State Hornets men's basketball seasons
Sacramento State
Sacramento State